Acacia luteola is a shrub of the genus Acacia and the subgenus Pulchellae that is endemic to an area of south west Australia.

Description
The green pinnules have a recurved to revolute shape and are obliquely narrowed at the apex. It blooms from February to November and produces cream-yellow flowers. The simple inflorescences usually are found occurring singly in the axils and have spherical to cylindrical shaped that contain 16 to 30 cream to pale yellow coloured flowers.

Taxonomy
The species was first formally described by the botanist Bruce Maslin in 1975 as a part of the work Studies in the genus Acacia (Mimosaceae) - A Revision of Series Pulchellae as published in the journal Nuytsia It was reclassified as Racosperma luteolum in 2003 by Leslie Pedley then transferred back to genus Acacia in 2006.

The type specimen was collected in 1922 by Charles Austin Gardner from the Porongurup Range.

Distribution
It is native to an area in the South West and Great Southern regions of Western Australia where it is commonly situated in low lying areas. The bulk of the population is found from Mount Barker to the Stirling Range in the north down to around Albany to the Beaufort Inlet in the south where it grows in sandy to sandy clay and loamy soils in seasonal swamps as a part of mallee or woodland and communities.

See also
 List of Acacia species

References

luteola
Endemic flora of Southwest Australia
Taxa named by Bruce Maslin
Plants described in 1975